Immenstedt refers to the following municipalities in Schleswig-Holstein, Germany:

 Immenstedt, Dithmarschen
 Immenstedt, Nordfriesland